Dale Township is a township in Kingman County, Kansas, USA.  As of the 2000 census, its population was 203.

Geography
Dale Township covers an area of 35.37 square miles (91.6 square kilometers); of this, 0.3 square miles (0.77 square kilometers) or 0.84 percent is water. The stream of Sand Creek runs through this township.

Unincorporated towns
 Georgia
 Murdock
(This list is based on USGS data and may include former settlements.)

Adjacent townships
 Galesburg Township (north)
 Evan Township (northeast)
 Vinita Township (east)
 Allen Township (southeast)
 Eagle Township (south)
 Richland Township (southwest)
 Ninnescah Township (west)
 White Township (northwest)

Cemeteries
The township contains two cemeteries: Bethany and Murdock.

References
 U.S. Board on Geographic Names (GNIS)
 United States Census Bureau cartographic boundary files

External links
 US-Counties.com
 City-Data.com

Townships in Kingman County, Kansas
Townships in Kansas